Aleksei Aleksandrovich Makushkin (born 17 September 1997) is a Russian football player. He plays for FC Khimik Dzerzhinsk.

Club career
He made his debut in the Russian Professional Football League for FC Lada-Togliatti on 5 June 2015 in a game against FC Spartak Yoshkar-Ola.

He made his Russian Football National League debut for FC Tekstilshchik Ivanovo on 20 July 2019 in a game against FC Khimki.

References

External links
 Profile by Russian Professional Football League
 

1997 births
Sportspeople from Penza Oblast
People from Penza Oblast
Living people
Russian footballers
Association football defenders
FC Lada-Tolyatti players
PFC Krylia Sovetov Samara players
FC Zenit-Izhevsk players
FC Tekstilshchik Ivanovo players
FC Volga Ulyanovsk players
FC Khimik Dzerzhinsk players
Russian First League players
Russian Second League players